Astrotricha are shrubs of the family Araliaceae. There are approximately 20 species:

Astrotricha asperifolia F.Muell. ex Klatt 
Astrotricha biddulphiana F.Muell. 
Astrotricha brachyandra A.R.Bean 
Astrotricha cordata  A.R.Bean 
Astrotricha crassifolia Blakely - thick-leaf star-hair
Astrotricha floccosa DC. - flannel leaf
Astrotricha glabra  Domin 
Astrotricha hamptonii  F.Muell. 
Astrotricha intermedia  A.R.Bean 
Astrotricha latifolia  Benth.
Astrotricha ledifolia  DC. - common star-hair
Astrotricha linearis  A.Cunn. ex Benth. - narrow-leaf star-hair
Astrotricha longifolia  Benth.
Astrotricha obovata  Makinson 
Astrotricha obtusifolia  Gand. 
Astrotricha parvifolia  N.A.Wakef. 
Astrotricha pauciflora  A.R.Bean 
Astrotricha pterocarpa  Benth. 
Astrotricha roddii  Makinson
Astrotricha umbrosa  A.R.Bean

References

Araliaceae
Apiales genera